Roman Kainz (born 14 November 1956) is an Austrian weightlifter. He competed in the men's middleweight event at the 1984 Summer Olympics.

References

External links
 

1956 births
Living people
Austrian male weightlifters
Olympic weightlifters of Austria
Weightlifters at the 1984 Summer Olympics
Place of birth missing (living people)
20th-century Austrian people